Down River is a 1931 British crime film directed by Peter Godfrey and starring Charles Laughton, Jane Baxter and Harold Huth. Based on a novel by "Seamark" (Austin J. Small), it was made at Lime Grove Studios with sets designed by Andrew Mazzei. Produced as a second feature, it is classified as a quota quickie.

Plot
A man smuggling drugs up the River Thames is caught when a newspaper reporter pursues him.

Cast
 Charles Laughton as Captain Grossman
 Jane Baxter as Hilary Gordon
 Harold Huth as John Durham
 Kenneth Kove as Ronnie Gordon
 Hartley Power as Lingard
 Arthur Goullet as Maxick
 Norman Shelley as Blind Rudley
 Frederick Leister as Inspector Manning
 Cyril McLaglen as Sergeant Proctor
 Humberston Wright as Sir Michael Gordon
 Hugh E. Wright as Charlie Wong

References

Bibliography
 Chibnall, Steve. Quota Quickies: The Birth of the British 'B' Film. British Film Institute, 2007.
Wood, Linda. British Films, 1927–1939. British Film Institute, 1986.

External links

1931 films
British crime films
1931 crime films
Films directed by Peter Godfrey
Films set in London
Gainsborough Pictures films
Films shot at Lime Grove Studios
Quota quickies
British black-and-white films
1930s English-language films
1930s British films